Eremiascincus brongersmai, also known commonly as Brongersma's tree skink and the brown-sided bar-lipped skink, is a species of lizard in the family Scincidae. The species is endemic to the state of Western Australia.

Etymology
The specific name, brongersmai, is in honor of Dutch herpetologist Leo Brongersma.

Habitat
The preferred natural habitats of E. brongersmai are rocky areas, shrubland, savanna, and forest.

Description
E. brongersmai has fully developed limbs, with five digits on each front foot and five digits on each hind foot.

Reproduction
E. brongersmai is oviparous.

References

Further reading
Cogger HG (2014). Reptiles and Amphibians of Australia, Seventh Edition. Clayton, Victoria, Australia: CSIRO Publishing. xxx + 1,033 pp. .
Mecke S, Doughty P, Donnellan SC (2009). "A new species of Eremiascincus (Reptilia: Squamata: Scincidae) from the Great Sandy Desert and Pilbara Coast, Western Australia and reassignment of eight species from Glaphyromorphus to Eremiascincus ". Zootaxa 2246: 1–20. (Eremiascincus brongersmai, new combination, p. 8). (in English, with an abstract in German).
Storr GM (1972). "Revisionary notes on the Sphenomorphus isolepis complex (Lacertilia, Scincidae)". Zoologische Mededelingen 47: 1–5. (Sphenomorphus brongersmai, new species).
Wilson S, Swan G (2013). A Complete Guide to Reptiles of Australia, Fourth Edition. Sydney: New Holland Publishers. 522 pp. .

Eremiascincus
Reptiles described in 1972
Taxa named by Glen Milton Storr